Ernestine Jane Geraldine Russell (June 21, 1921 – February 28, 2011) was an American actress, singer, and model. She was one of Hollywood's leading sex symbols in the 1940s and 1950s. She starred in more than 20 films.

Russell moved from the Midwest to California, where she had her first film role in Howard Hughes' The Outlaw (1943). In 1947, Russell delved into music before returning to films. After starring in several films in the 1950s, including Gentlemen Prefer Blondes (1953), Russell again returned to music while completing several other films in the 1960s.

Russell married three times, adopted three children, and in 1955 founded Waif, the first international adoption program. She received several accolades for her achievements in film. Her hand and footprints were immortalized in the forecourt of Grauman's Chinese Theatre. A star with her name was placed on the Hollywood Walk of Fame.

Early life

Russell was born on June 21, 1921, at Sanford Bemidji Medical Center in Bemidji, Minnesota. She was the eldest child and only daughter of the five children of Geraldine (née Jacobi) and Roy William Russell, who married on March 22, 1918, in Kalamazoo, Michigan. Her brothers were Thomas, Kenneth, Jamie, and Wallace.

Her father had been a first lieutenant in the U.S. Army, and her mother an actress with a road troupe; her mother was also the subject of a portrait by Mary Bradish Titcomb, Portrait of Geraldine J., which received public attention when purchased by Woodrow Wilson. Russell's parents lived in Edmonton, Alberta until shortly before her birth and returned to that city nine days after her birth, where they lived for the first one or two years of her life. The family then moved to Southern California where her father worked as an office manager.

Russell's mother arranged for her to take piano lessons. In addition to music, she was interested in drama and participated in stage productions at Van Nuys High School. Her early ambition was to be a designer of some kind, until the death of her father in his mid-40s, when she decided to work as a receptionist after graduation. She also modeled for photographers, and, at the urging of her mother, studied drama and acting with Max Reinhardt's Theatrical Workshop and with actress and acting coach Maria Ouspenskaya.

Career

The Outlaw

In 1940, Russell was signed to a seven-year contract by film mogul Howard Hughes, and made her motion-picture debut in The Outlaw (1943), a story about Billy the Kid that went to great lengths to showcase her voluptuous figure.

The movie was completed in 1941, but it was not released until 1943 in a limited release. Problems occurred with the censorship of the production code over the way her ample cleavage was displayed in promotion of the film.

When the movie was finally passed, it had a general release in 1946. During that time, Russell was kept busy doing publicity and became known nationally. Contrary to countless incorrect reports in the media since the release of The Outlaw, Russell did not wear the specially designed underwire bra that Howard Hughes had designed and made for her to wear during filming. According to Jane's 1985 autobiography, she said that the bra was so uncomfortable that she secretly discarded it and wore her own bra with the cups padded with tissue and the straps pulled up to elevate her breasts.

Russell's measurements were 38-24-36, and she stood 5 ft 7 in (97-61-91 cm and 1.7 m), making her more statuesque than most of her contemporaries. Her favorite co-star Bob Hope once introduced her as "the two and only Jane Russell". He joked, "Culture is the ability to describe Jane Russell without moving your hands." Howard Hughes said, "There are two good reasons why men go to see her. Those are enough."

She was a popular pin-up photo with servicemen during World War II. Speaking about her sex appeal, Russell later said, "Sex appeal is good – but not in bad taste. Then it's ugly. I don't think a star has any business posing in a vulgar way. I've seen plenty of pin-up pictures that have sex appeal, interest, and allure, but they're not vulgar. They have a little art to them. Marilyn's calendar was artistic."

She did not appear in another movie until 1946, when she played Joan Kenwood in Young Widow for Hunt Stromberg, who released it through United Artists. The film went over budget by $600,000 and was a box office failure.

Early musical ventures

In 1947, Russell launched a musical career. She sang with the Kay Kyser Orchestra on radio, and recorded two singles with his band, "As Long As I Live" and "Boin-n-n-ng!" She also cut a 78 rpm album that year for Columbia Records, Let's Put Out the Lights, which included eight torch ballads and cover art that included a diaphanous gown.

In a 2009 interview for the liner notes to another CD, Fine and Dandy, Russell denounced the Columbia album as "horrible and boring to listen to". It was reissued on CD in 2002, in a package that also included the Kyser singles and two songs she recorded for Columbia in 1949 that had gone unreleased at the time. In 1950, she recorded a single, "Kisses and Tears", with Frank Sinatra and The Modernaires for Columbia.

The Paleface
Russell's career revived when she was cast as Calamity Jane opposite Bob Hope in The Paleface (1948) on loan out to Paramount. The film was a sizeable box office hit, earning $4.5 million and becoming Paramount's most successful release of the year.

Russell shot Montana Belle  for Fidelity Pictures in 1948, playing Belle Starr. The film was intended to be released by Republic Pictures, but the producer sold the film to RKO, who released it in 1952.

RKO Pictures

Howard Hughes bought RKO Pictures, and would be Russell's main employer for the next few years.

At that studio, Russell co-starred with Groucho Marx and Frank Sinatra in a musical comedy, Double Dynamite, shot in 1948 and released in 1951. It was a critical and commercial failure.

Hughes cast Russell opposite Robert Mitchum and Vincent Price in His Kind of Woman (1951), a film noir originally directed by John Farrow in 1950 which would be reshot by Richard Fleischer the following year. Russell sang two songs in the movie.

Russell did two more film noirs: The Las Vegas Story (1952) with Price and Victor Mature, and Macao (1952) with Mitchum. His Kind of Woman and Macao were minor hits but both involved so much re-shooting because of the interference of Hughes that they lost money.

Paramount borrowed Russell for a reunion with Hope, Son of Paleface (1952), which was another hit. She had a cameo in Road to Bali (1953).

Gentlemen Prefer Blondes

Russell played Dorothy Shaw in the hit film Gentlemen Prefer Blondes (1953) opposite Marilyn Monroe for 20th Century Fox. The film was a huge success, Russell's biggest hit since The Outlaw, making over $5 million.

Back at RKO, she was in Howard Hughes's production The French Line (1954), a musical. The movie's penultimate moment showed Russell in a form-fitting one-piece bathing suit with strategic cutouts, performing a then-provocative musical number titled "Lookin' for Trouble". In her autobiography, Russell said that the revealing outfit was an alternative to Hughes' original suggestion of a bikini, a very racy choice for a movie costume in 1954. Russell said that she initially wore the bikini in front of her "horrified" movie crew while "feeling very naked". The movie earned $3 million.

Hughes also produced Underwater! (1955), an adventure film with Russell and Richard Egan at RKO. It made $2 million but because of its large cost was a financial flop. Her contract with Hughes ended in February 1954.

Russ-Field Productions
In 1953, Russell and her first husband, former Los Angeles Rams quarterback Bob Waterfield, formed Russ-Field Productions. In March 1954, they signed a six-picture deal with United Artists to last over three years; Russell only had to appear in three of the films.

Russ-Field loaned out Russell's services for appearing as Amanda Lawrence in Foxfire (1955) at Universal, opposite Jeff Chandler. Russell was paid $200,000 for her role and had the right to draw on Chandler's services for a film later on for her own production company. The film was a moderate success, earning $2 million.

Russell co-starred with Clark Gable in The Tall Men (1955) at 20th Century Fox, one of the most popular films of the year, with earnings of $6 million.

Russ-Field produced Gentlemen Marry Brunettes (1955), a sequel to Blondes in which Russell starred alongside Jeanne Crain, for release through United Artists. It was not as successful as the original.

Russ-Field also made some films without Russell for United Artists: The King and Four Queens (1956) starring Clark Gable and Eleanor Parker (co-produced with Gable's company), and Run for the Sun (1956) starring Richard Widmark and Jane Greer.

Russell-Field's last production was The Fuzzy Pink Nightgown (1957), starring Russell, which was a box-office failure.

Return to music
On the musical front, Russell formed a gospel quartet in 1954, with three other members of a faith-sharing group called the Hollywood Christian Group. The other original members were Connie Haines, Beryl Davis and Della Russell. Haines was a former vocalist in the Harry James and Tommy Dorsey orchestras, while Davis was a British emigrant who had moved to the United States after success entertaining American troops stationed in England during World War II. Della Russell was the wife of crooner Andy Russell. Backed by an orchestra conducted by Lyn Murray, their choral single "Do Lord" reached number 27 on the Billboard singles chart in May 1954, selling two million copies. Della Russell, no relation to Jane, soon left the group, but Jane, Haines and Davis followed up with a trio LP for Capitol Records, The Magic of Believing. Later, another Hollywood bombshell, Rhonda Fleming, joined them for more gospel recordings. The Capitol LP was issued on CD in 2008, in a package that also included the choral singles by the original quartet and two tracks with Fleming replacing Della Russell. A collection of some of Russell's gospel and secular recordings was issued on CD in Britain in 2005, and it includes more secular recordings, including Russell's spoken-word performances of Hollywood Riding Hood and Hollywood Cinderella backed by a jazz group that featured Terry Gibbs and Tony Scott.

In October 1957, she debuted in a successful solo nightclub act at the Sands Hotel in Las Vegas. She also fulfilled later engagements in the United States, Canada, Mexico, South America and Europe. A self-titled solo LP was issued on MGM Records in 1959. It was reissued on CD in 2009 under the title Fine and Dandy, and the CD included some demo and soundtrack recordings, as well. "I finally got to make a record the way I wanted to make it," she said of the MGM album in the liner notes to the CD reissue. In 1959, she debuted with a tour of Janus in New England, performed in Skylark and also starred in Bells Are Ringing at the Westchester Town House in Yonkers, New York.

Television
Russell moved into television, appearing in episodes of Colgate Theatre, Westinghouse Desilu Playhouse, Death Valley Days (the "Splinter Station", 1960) and The Red Skelton Hour. In 1999, she remarked, "Why did I quit movies? Because I was getting too old! You couldn't go on acting in those years if you were an actress over 30."

Russell was referenced in a 1956 episode of The Honeymooners. Ralph Kramden (played by Jackie Gleason) arrives home "dead" tired, vowing to go straight to bed after dinner, quipping, "You couldn't get me out of this house tonight if you told me that Jane Russell was runnin’ a party upstairs and she couldn't get started until I arrived!" Later, Kramden becomes aware that his best friend and neighbor, Ed Norton, is in fact throwing a party upstairs and did not invite him. After being reminded by his wife, Alice, of his reluctance to attend even a party that Jane Russell was throwing, an insulted Kramden rants, "I was talking about Jane Russell: I said nothing about any party that Norton's running!"

On the sitcom Maude (the episode "The Wallet"), Walter Findlay (played by Bill Macy) carries a lipstick impression and autograph of Jane Russell on a cocktail napkin in his wallet as a good luck charm.

Her last on-screen appearance was in a 1986 episode of Hunter.

Later career
Russell made her first movie appearance in a number of years in Fate Is the Hunter (1964), in which she was seen as herself performing for the USO in a flashback sequence. She was second-billed in two A.C. Lyles Westerns, Johnny Reno (1966) and Waco (1966), and starred in Cauliflower Cupids, filmed in 1966 but not released until 1970. She had a character role in The Born Losers (1967) and Darker Than Amber (1970).

In 1971, Russell starred in the musical drama Company, making her debut on Broadway in the role of Joanne, succeeding Elaine Stritch. Russell performed the role of Joanne for almost six months. Also in the 1970s, Russell started appearing in television commercials as a spokeswoman for Playtex "'Cross-Your-Heart Bras' for us full-figured gals", featuring the "18-Hour Bra", still one of International Playtex's best-known products even as of early March 2011. She had a semi-recurring guest role in The Yellow Rose (1983) on television and guest-starred on Hunter (1986). Russell wrote an autobiography, Jane Russell: My Path and My Detours (1985).

In 1989, Russell received the Women's International Center  Living Legacy Award. Her handprints and footprints are immortalized at Grauman's Chinese Theatre, and she has a star on the Hollywood Walk of Fame at 6850 Hollywood Boulevard. Russell was voted one of the 40 Most Iconic Movie Goddesses of all time in 2009 by Glamour (UK edition).

Portrayals
Russell was portrayed by Renee Henderson in the CBS miniseries Blonde (2001), based on the novel by Joyce Carol Oates and portrayed leaving her imprints at Grauman's along with Marilyn Monroe in the HBO film Norma Jean & Marilyn (1996), starring Ashley Judd and Mira Sorvino.

Personal life

Russell described herself as "vigorously pro-life". She was left unable to bear children, after a botched abortion in her teenage years robbed her of her fertility.

Russell was married three times, first to Bob Waterfield, from 1943 until their divorce in July 1968. He was a UCLA All-American, Cleveland Rams quarterback, Los Angeles Rams quarterback, Los Angeles Rams head coach, and member of the Pro Football Hall of Fame. Two months after their divorce, Russell married actor Roger Barrett who died of a heart attack only two months later in November 1968. She married real-estate broker John Calvin Peoples on January 31, 1974, living with him until his death from heart failure on April 9, 1999. In the late 1970s, Russell and Peoples moved to Sedona, Arizona, where they owned Dude's nightclub, and Russell revived her nightclub act. They spent the majority of their married life residing in Santa Maria, California.

In February 1952, Russell and Waterfield adopted a baby girl, whom they named Tracy. In December 1952, they adopted a 15-month-old boy, Thomas, whose birth mother, Hannah McDermott, had moved to London to escape poverty in Northern Ireland, and, in 1956, they adopted a nine-month-old boy, Robert John. In 1955, she founded Waif, an organization to place children with adoptive families, and which pioneered adoptions from foreign countries by Americans. At the height of her career, Russell started the "Hollywood Christian Group", a weekly Bible study at her home which was attended by many of the leading names in the film industry.

In the film Philomena (2013), Russell's photograph appears on a wall; a character states that Russell bought a child for £1000 from the tainted Sean Ross Abbey in Ireland featured in this true-life film, but this claim is countered in at least one recent British report, which states that in the mid-1950s, Russell and her husband "rather informally adopted a son from a woman living in London, but originating in Derry, Northern Ireland. There was a major scandal and a court case, after which Russell was allowed to formalise the adoption."

Marilyn Monroe once said, "Jane tried to convert me (to religion), and I tried to introduce her to Freud". Russell had tried to take her to a bible study for Hollywood stars. In an interview, Russell later said "I certainly wasn't trying to convert her to religion because I don't like religion", denoting that she didn't consider Christianity "a religion". Russell appeared occasionally on the Praise the Lord program on the Trinity Broadcasting Network, a Christian television channel based in Costa Mesa, California.

Russell was a prominent supporter of the Republican Party, and attended Dwight D. Eisenhower's inauguration, along with such other notables from Hollywood as Lou Costello, Dick Powell, June Allyson, Hugh O'Brian, Anita Louise and Louella Parsons. She was a recovering alcoholic who had gone into rehab at age 79, and described herself in a 2003 interview, saying, "These days, I am a teetotal, mean-spirited, right-wing, narrow-minded, conservative Christian bigot, but not a racist."

Russell resided in the Santa Maria Valley along the Central Coast of California. She died at her home in 507 Boscoe Ct, Santa Maria. of a respiratory-related illness on February 28, 2011. Her funeral was held on March 12, 2011, at Pacific Christian Church, Santa Maria.

Filmography

 The Outlaw (1943)
 Young Widow (1946)
 The Paleface (1948)
 His Kind of Woman (1951)
 Double Dynamite (1951)
 The Las Vegas Story (1952)
 Macao (1952)
 Son of Paleface (1952)
 Montana Belle (1952)
 Road to Bali (1952; cameo)
 Gentlemen Prefer Blondes (1953) as Dorothy Shaw
 The French Line (1954)
 Underwater! (1955)
 Foxfire (1955)
 The Tall Men (1955) as Nella Turner
 Gentlemen Marry Brunettes (1955)
 Hot Blood (1956)
 The Revolt of Mamie Stover (1956)
 The Fuzzy Pink Nightgown (1957)
 Fate Is the Hunter (1964; cameo)
 Johnny Reno (1966)
 Waco (1966)
 The Born Losers (1967)
 Darker than Amber (1970)

Radio appearances

Citations

General bibliography

External links

 
 
 
 
 

1921 births
2011 deaths
20th-century American actresses
Actresses from Minnesota
Adoption workers
American gospel singers
American female models
American women singers
American film actresses
American stage actresses
American television actresses
Assemblies of God people
California Republicans
People from Bemidji, Minnesota
People from Santa Maria, California
People from Sedona, Arizona
Van Nuys High School alumni
RKO Pictures contract players
Female models from Minnesota
International adoption
Articles containing video clips
Conservatism in the United States
21st-century American women
United Service Organizations entertainers